Boutte or Boutté may refer to

Places
Boutte, Louisiana, a census-designated place in United States

People
Alvin J. Boutte (1929–2012), founder of the largest Black-owned bank in the U.S., Chicago civic leader and civil rights activist
Denise Boutte, American actress and model 
Duane Boutte (born 1966), American actor, director, and composer 
Etnah Rochon Boutte (1880—1973), African-American educator, pharmacist, and clubwoman
John Boutté (born 1958), American jazz singer 
Kayshon Boutte (born 2002), American football player
Lillian Boutté (born 1949), American jazz singer
Marc Boutte (born 1969), American football defensive tackle